Tauno Mäki (6 December 1912 – 7 October 1983) was a Finnish sport shooter. He was born in Karinainen, Pöytyä. He won a bronze medal in 100 metre running deer at the 1952 Summer Olympics in Helsinki.

References

1912 births
1983 deaths
People from Pöytyä
Finnish male sport shooters
Olympic shooters of Finland
Olympic bronze medalists for Finland
Shooters at the 1952 Summer Olympics
Medalists at the 1952 Summer Olympics
Olympic medalists in shooting
Sportspeople from Southwest Finland